George Ernest Barker (1930 – 16 March 2014) was a British philatelist who in 2009 signed the Roll of Distinguished Philatelists. From 1983 to 2001 he was Editor of The London Philatelist. He was a specialist in the stamps of France and its colonies.

Barker was one of the main organisers of the 56th Philatelic Congress of Great Britain held in 1974 at Enghien-les-Bains, Paris.

Memberships
Associate member of the Academy of Philately, Paris.
Member of the Belgian Academy of Philately.
Founding member of the Académie Européenne de Philatélie.
Fellow of the Royal Philatelic Society London.

Awards
Award of Merit, British Philatelic Federation.
Mérite Philatélique Européen, Académie Européenne de Philatélie.
Roll of Distinguished Philatelists.

References

British philatelists
Fellows of the Royal Philatelic Society London
2014 deaths
Signatories to the Roll of Distinguished Philatelists
1930 births